A. Y. Jackson Secondary School is a secondary school for grades 9 to 12 in Toronto, Ontario, Canada. It was opened in 1970 by the North York Board of Education, and is now operated by its successor, the Toronto District School Board. The school was named after A. Y. Jackson, a Canadian painter and one of the founders of the Group of Seven.

History 
A.Y. Jackson was opened in 1970 under the North York Board of Education, as a grades 10 to 13 school. However, as part of the 1998 amalgamation of North York into the City of Toronto, the Toronto District School Board now operates A.Y. Jackson. In 2016, as part of a TDSB board decision, the school underwent more changes, with the school now supporting grade nine students and the Gifted program.

Student life

Academics 
The school offers three Specialist High Skills Majors (SHSM) in the fields of Biotechnology, Business, and Information Communications Technology. It also offers three dual credit courses in Forensic Science, Introduction to Marketing, and Composition & Creativity, in collaboration with Seneca College. The school also serves as the giftedness program secondary school for much of east North York, as well as parts of Scarborough. In the 2018–2019 school year, 90% of grade 9 students achieved the provincial standard in academic math and 50% achieved the provincial standard in applied math. In addition, in the 2018–2019 school year, 87% of grade 10 students achieved the provincial standard for Literacy on their first attempt.

Sports 
Currently, A.Y. Jackson has the following sports teams:
 Aquatics
 Badminton
 Basketball
 Cross country
 Curling
 Flag football
 Table tennis
 Soccer
 Ultimate frisbee 
 Volleyball
 Ice hockey
 Field hockey

Clubs 
In the 2021–2022 school year, A.Y. Jackson has 52 different clubs, councils and ensembles, including 5 related to the arts, and 13 related to the STEM fields.

Student demographics 
The student population of A.Y Jackson is diverse, with a large component of students living in Canada for five years or less (about 14%), and around 92% of the population speaking a primary language other than English. As of 2020, 14% of the students are enrolled in the gifted program and 25% of students live in lower-income households. There were 263 females and 290 males in the school in 2020, making A.Y. Jackson's total student body 653 as of June 30, 2021.

Notable alumni 

 Henry Lau, singer, musician, actor, and ex-member of Super Junior-M
 Alex Lifeson, guitarist for the rock group Rush
 Sorel Mizzi, professional poker player
 Daniel Negreanu, professional poker player
 Merrill Nisker (better known as Peaches), electronica musician
 Monita Rajpal, CNN International news anchor
 Gerald Eaton, producer, lead singer of The Philosopher Kings

See also

List of high schools in Ontario

References

External links
 A. Y. Jackson Secondary School website

High schools in Toronto
Schools in the TDSB
Educational institutions established in 1970
1970 establishments in Ontario